Anael is an alternative name for the angel or archangel Haniel.

Anael may also refer to:
 Anael (Book of Tobit), person in scripture
Anael (Kushiel's Legacy), character in fantasy novel series